Legge is a surname. Notable people with the surname include:

Alexander Legge (1866–1933), US businessman, president of International Harvester
Anthony Legge (1939–2013), British archaeologist specialized in zooarchaeology
Arthur Kaye Legge KCB (1766–1835), Royal Navy officer 
Arthur Legge (British Army officer) (1800–1890), British soldier and politician
Arthur Legge (footballer) (1881–1941), Australian sportsman
Augustus Legge (1839–1913), bishop of Lichfield from 1891 until 1913
Barnwell R. Legge (1891–1949), US Army officer and WWII Military Attaché to Switzerland
Barry Legge (born 1954), retired Canadian ice hockey player who played in the National Hockey League
Charles A. Legge (born 1930), former United States federal judge
Charles Legge (1829–1881), Canadian civil engineer and patent solicitor
David Legge (born 1954), Australian rules footballer with St Kilda
Dominica Legge (1905–1986), British scholar of the Anglo-Norman language
Dominique de Legge (born 1952), French politician, member of the Senate of France
Eddie Legge (1902–1947), Scottish footballer with Carlisle United and York City
Edward Legge (bishop) (1767–1827), Bishop of Oxford, clergyman
Edward Legge (Royal Navy officer) (1710–1747), Royal Navy officer and posthumous MP for Portsmouth
Francis Legge (c.1719–1783), British military officer and colonial official in Nova Scotia
Geoffrey Legge (1903–1940), English first-class cricketer
George Legge, 1st Baron Dartmouth (c. 1647–1691) 
George Legge, 3rd Earl of Dartmouth (1755–1810)
Gerald Legge, 9th Earl of Dartmouth (1924–1997)
Gordon Legge (born 1948), Professor of Psychology at the University of Minnesota
H. Dormer Legge (1890–1982), British Army officer and philatelist
Heneage Legge (1788–1844), Member of Parliament (MP) for Banbury
Heneage Legge (1845–1911), MP for St George's Hanover Square, nephew of the above
Henry Bilson-Legge (1708–1764), English statesman
Henry Legge (courtier) (1852–1924), Paymaster of the Household to King George V
Humphry Legge, 8th Earl of Dartmouth (1888–1962)
James Gordon Legge (1863–1947), WWI Australian Army Lieutenant General
James Legge (1815–1897), Scottish sinologist (professor of Chinese)
John Williamson Legge (1917–1996), Australian scientist and activist.
Joan Margaret Legge (1885–1939), English botanist
Katherine Legge (born 1980), British racecar driver
Laura Legge QC (born 1923), treasurer of the Law Society of Upper Canada
Leon Legge (born 1985), English footballer who plays for Cambridge United
Lionel K. Legge (1889–1970), associate justice of the South Carolina Supreme Court
Michael Legge (actor) (born 1978), British actor 
Michael Legge (comedian) (born 1968), Irish comedian 
Michael Legge (filmmaker) (born 1953), American actor and independent filmmaker 
Paterno Legge, South Sudanese politician, former Minister of Local Government of Central Equatoria
Randy Legge (born 1945), Canadian ice hockey defenceman with the New York Rangers
Stanley Ferguson Legge CBE (1900–1977), Australian soldier and son of James Gordon Legge
Thomas Legge (1535–1607), English playwright
Thomas Morison Legge CBE MD (1863–1932), UK Medical Inspector of Factories and Workshops
Topsy Jane Legge (1938–2014), English actress under the name of Topsy Jane
Wade Legge (1934–1963), American jazz pianist and bassist
Walter Legge (1906–1979), English classical record producer and impresario
William Gordon Legge (1913–1999), Anglican Bishop of the Diocese of Western Newfoundland 
William Kaye Legge (1869–1946), senior British Army officer during World War I
William Legge, 1st Earl of Dartmouth (1672–1750)
William Legge, 2nd Earl of Dartmouth (1731–1801)
William Legge, 4th Earl of Dartmouth (1784–1853) 
William Legge, 5th Earl of Dartmouth (1823–1891)
William Legge, 6th Earl of Dartmouth (1851–1936) 
William Legge, 7th Earl of Dartmouth (1881–1958) 
William Legge, 10th Earl of Dartmouth (born 1949)
William Legge (Royalist) (1608–1670), English royalist army officer
William Vincent Legge (1841–1918), Australian ornithologist

See also
Legge romanization, a transcription system for Mandarin Chinese
Legge-Bourke, a surname
Legg, a surname
Legg Mason, multi-national investment firm
Leg (disambiguation)

English-language surnames
Surnames of English origin